1908 was the 19th season of County Championship cricket in England. American John Barton "Bart" King topped the bowling averages as a member of the touring Philadelphian cricket team.

Honours
County Championship - Yorkshire
Minor Counties Championship - Staffordshire
Wisden (Lord Hawke and Four Cricketers of the Year) - Walter Brearley, Lord Hawke, Jack Hobbs, Alan Marshal, John Newstead

County Championship

Leading batsmen
Bernard Bosanquet topped the averages with 1081 runs @ 54.05

Leading bowlers
Philadelphian Bart King topped the averages with 87 wickets @ 11.01

References

Annual reviews
 Wisden Cricketers' Almanack 1909

External links
 CricketArchive – season summaries

1908 in English cricket
English cricket seasons in the 20th century